The French SS Volunteer Assault Brigade, most commonly known as the Brigade Frankreich was a unit of the Waffen-SS of Nazi Germany during World War II. It was formed in 1943 after a change in the admission standards of the Waffen-SS allowed Frenchmen to enlist for the first time. After training in Alsace, the brigade served on the Eastern Front before merging with the Legion of French Volunteers Against Bolshevism to form the SS Division Charlemagne.

Formation 
Sixteen recruiting stations were set up and attracted around 3,000 applicants from German-occupied France,  many of whom were university students or existing members of the collaborationist paramilitary Milice. Recruit had to be "free of Jewish blood" and between 20 and 25 years old.

Training took place at the Sankt Andreas camp of Sennheim (now Cernay, in Alsace) under former Swiss army instructor SS Major Heinrich Hersche. In August 1943 a first cohort of 800 recruits arrived for training. Their instructors were Dutch and Flemish Belgian, and orders were given in German. Officers were sent to the SS-Junkerschule at Bad Tölz in Bavaria, where Lieutenant-Colonel Paul Marie Gamory-Dubourdeau received a commission as major at the end of the special training course and returned to the brigade as its commander. NCOs were sent to the SS school in Posen. Uniforms were entirely German without any French insignia.

In March 1944 the entire regiment was assembled at the Waffen-SS Neweklau camp near Prague and continued training under Gamory-Dubourdeau. In spring 1944, five infantry companies of 200 men each were formed under French SS officers, including Henri Joseph Fenet. As of 30 June 1944 the total strength of the brigade was 1,688 officers and men.

On 29 July 1944, under the command of former militia leader Captain Pierre Cance, a reinforced battalion of 18 officers and 1,000 enlisted men was sent to the Galicia on the Russian Front. In August it was attached as a reinforcement to the 18th SS Division "Horst Wessel". In less than two weeks the brigade lost about one hundred men in combat. 

In September 1944 the brigade was merged with the recently disbanded Legion of French Volunteers Against Bolshevism (LVF), formed within the German Army (Wehrmacht) in 1941, which went on to form the core of a Waffen grenadier division known as the SS Division Charlemagne.

Commanders
 SS-Obersturmbannführer Paul Gamory-Dubourdeau

See also
Walloon Legion, a pre-existing Wehrmacht formation incorporated into the Waffen-SS in June 1943

Notes

References

Sources

Further reading

 

French collaborators with Nazi Germany
Military units and formations established in 1943
Foreign volunteer units of the Waffen-SS
Military units and formations disestablished in 1945
1943 establishments in France
1945 disestablishments in France